Thomas Steven Middleditch (born March 10, 1982) is a Canadian-American actor, comedian and screenwriter. He is known for his role as Richard Hendricks in the HBO series Silicon Valley (2014–2019), earning a nomination for the Primetime Emmy Award for Outstanding Lead Actor in a Comedy Series. He has voiced Penn Zero in the Disney XD animated series Penn Zero: Part-Time Hero (2014–2017), Harold Hutchins in Captain Underpants: The First Epic Movie (2017), Sam Coleman in Godzilla: King of the Monsters (2019) and Terry in the Hulu adult animated sci-fi series Solar Opposites. Middleditch also appears in ads for Verizon Wireless.

Early life
Middleditch was born on March 10, 1982, in Nelson, British Columbia, Canada. His parents are British. He was cast in a play in eighth grade which he said "changed everything" for him. He discovered improv in grade school from performing with Theatresports. His first job was acting in Canadian Heritage Plays for his hometown.

He studied theatre at the University of Victoria before moving to Toronto, where he auditioned for and enrolled in George Brown Theatre School, but never began his course. He instead opted to make sketches on his own and worked at a New Balance store for an income. He relocated to Chicago, where he took classes at The Second City and iO Theater, while also performing regularly. He was a founding member in 2005 of The Improvised Shakespeare Company. Due to immigration issues, he worked various cash jobs until Charna Halpern sponsored him to get his work visa. While performing on a Second City cruise, he got an audition for Saturday Night Live. Though he did not get cast, the routine he used in his audition landed him a network holding deal and he moved to New York City.

Career

While living in New York City, Middleditch began acting in commercials. In 2007 a sketch video for Chicken McNuggets he made with Fernando Sosa in Chicago was purchased by McDonald's and used as a commercial. He appeared in the 2009 romantic comedy Splinterheads, portraying the lead role of Justin Frost. On March 25, 2010, he joined a CBS pilot, Hitched, written by Josh Schwartz and directed by Rob Greenberg. On May 5, 2011, Middleditch made his first appearance in Jake and Amir, in the episode "Jake and Amir: Doobs".

On May 31, 2011, Middleditch joined the cast of the Paramount Pictures' comedy film Fun Size, directed by Josh Schwartz. On August 8, 2011, he joined Road to Nardo, a film that would have been Scot Armstrong's directorial debut. On December 12, 2011, he joined Jay Roach's The Campaign, starring Will Ferrell and Zach Galifianakis.

On July 23, 2012, Middleditch joined the cast of the comedy film Someone Marry Barry, directed and written by Rob Pearlstein and produced by Barry Josephson. On August 23, 2012, he appeared in The Offices final season episode "The Farm". He had a role in the 2013 comedy fantasy film The Brass Teapot, directed by Ramaa Mosley, and played a police officer in the 2013 CBS Films coming-of-age comedy film The Kings of Summer.

On January 30, 2013, Middleditch joined HBO's comedy pilot Silicon Valley playing Richard Hendricks. He has said that the pilot was written with him specifically in mind as the lead (the character was originally named Thomas Pickering; the latter being his mother's maiden name). This was a result of a "random" audio sketch he once made for a stand-up routine which he would later animate himself and pitched to several people, including Mike Judge's production partners John Altschuler and Dave Krinsky, who would later create the show.

For his work on the show, Middleditch has garnered four Satellite Awards nominations and a win in 2019,  and two Critics' Choice Television Award nominations. In 2016, Middleditch earned his first Primetime Emmy Award nomination for Outstanding Lead Actor in a Comedy Series for his performance in the show.

On April 23, 2013, he was added to the cast of the comedy film Search Party, playing Nardo, who travels to Mexico to win his fiancé back, starring alongside one of his Silicon Valley alumni, T.J. Miller. Middleditch made a small cameo appearance in the 2013 film The Wolf of Wall Street as a broker who is fired for cleaning his fish bowl during office hours.

He has played as a hipster thief in the You're The Worst episode "Sunday Funday". On The Pete Holmes Show, he played Nightcrawler and Gambit from the X-Men and Vega and Ken from Street Fighter II. On October 16, 2013, it was announced that the Disney XD-produced animated series Penn Zero: Part-Time Hero would star Middleditch as the titular multiverse-hopping hero. The series premiered in late 2014. In 2015, he co-starred in the films The Final Girls and The Bronze. Also in 2015, he began streaming himself playing video games on the website Twitch.

In 2014 he joined a CollegeHumor series on YouTube called CAMP.

Middleditch voiced Harold Hutchins in DreamWorks Animation's animated feature Captain Underpants: The First Epic Movie (2017), based on Dav Pilkey's book Captain Underpants. As of 2017, Middleditch has appeared in Verizon commercials as their spokesperson. In 2019, he appeared in the MonsterVerse film Godzilla: King of the Monsters and the basketball video game NBA 2K20.

In April 2020, Middleditch and fellow improviser Ben Schwartz starred in Netflix's first long-form improv special, Middleditch and Schwartz, a series of three-hourlong performances filmed at New York University's Skirball Center for the Performing Arts.

In October 2020, Middleditch began playing the lead role of Drew Dunbar in the CBS comedy series B Positive which was written by Chuck Lorre. The series was originally supposed to air in March 2020, but production was halted due to the COVID-19 pandemic; however, filming of the pilot had already taken place and so the show was moved to be CBS' only fall debut.

Personal life
Middleditch became engaged to costume designer Mollie Gates in June 2015. They were married on August 22, 2015, in Middleditch's hometown. In a 2019 Playboy interview, he revealed that the pair had an open relationship and said that "swinging has saved our marriage." In May 2020, Gates filed for divorce, citing irreconcilable differences. The divorce was reportedly finalized in April 2021.

Middleditch stated during a January 2022 appearance on The Late Show with Stephen Colbert that he had become a U.S. citizen.

In March 2021, the Los Angeles Times published allegations that Middleditch sexually harassed women at Cloak & Dagger, a Los Angeles-based goth club, including one incident where he groped a woman's breast. The woman revealed several messages she received from Middleditch in which he apologized for the incident.

Filmography

Film

Television

Web

Video games

Awards and nominations

References

External links

 

1982 births
Living people
21st-century Canadian male actors
21st-century Canadian screenwriters
Canadian male comedians
Canadian male film actors
Canadian male television actors
Canadian male television writers
Canadian male voice actors
Canadian people of English descent
Canadian sketch comedians
Canadian television writers
Male actors from British Columbia
Naturalized citizens of the United States
People from Nelson, British Columbia
Twitch (service) streamers
Upright Citizens Brigade Theater performers
Writers from British Columbia